Azerbaijan National Aerospace Agency (MAKA) is a governmental body that coordinates all Azerbaijani space research programs with scientific and commercial goals. National Aerospace Agency has been operating as a "Kaspiy" Scientific Center within the National Academy of Sciences of Azerbaijan since 1974 and the Space Exploration Scientific Production Association (CTEB) was established based on "Kaspiy" Scientific Center in 1981. Azerbaijan National Aerospace Agency was established in 1992 by the Decree No. 580 of Azerbaijani President in place of the Kaspiy scientific research center of the National Academy of Sciences of Azerbaijan.

History
The Azerbaijani space programme is mostly carried out through international cooperation as during the Soviet era, a few Azerbaijani plants produced equipment for the Soviet Union’s space projects, but their facilities are now out-of-date. The programme has included a sequence of satellite missions, both national ones and in cooperation with other nations.

In 2006, the agency transferred to Ministry of Defence Industry of Azerbaijan. In 2009, Azerbaijani space industry boosted as new agency set up under the state program for development of space industry after Ilham Aliyev's approval. As part of the program, by 2013 it is planned to make proposals for the in-country assembly and production of VSAT (Very Small Aperture satellite Terminal). A small earth station for satellite transmission that handles up to 56 kbit/s of digital transmission. VSATs that handle the T1 data rate (up to 1.544 Mbit/s) are called "TSATs. and parts of other terminal stations, satellite receivers of different types and functions (internet, direct TV, GPS, etc.) in order to create the space industry.

On 30 June 2014, MAKA with cooperation from Airbus launched SPOT 7 Earth observation satellite. They form a constellation of Earth-imaging satellites designed to provide continuity of high-resolution, wide-swath data up to 2024.

Missions and projects
 Azerspace-1, with Azercosmos (launched February 7, 2013; operated by Azercosmos)
 SPOT 7 (launched June 30, 2014)
 Azerspace-2, with Azercosmos (launched September 25, 2018; operated by Azercosmos)

Organizations included 
 Institute for Space Research of Natural Resources
 Research Institute of Aerospace Information
 Institute of Ecology
 Space Instrument Engineering Experimental Plant
 Special Design Bureau of Instrument Engineering
 Special Design -Technological Bureau (Lenkoran city)

See also 
List of government space agencies
Azercosmos
Shamakhi Astrophysical Observatory

References

Space program of Azerbaijan
Space agencies
1992 establishments in Azerbaijan
1974 establishments in the Soviet Union
Research institutes established in 1974
Research institutes in Azerbaijan
Research institutes in the Soviet Union